Railroad Pass is a mountain pass in Cochise County, Arizona.

History
Railroad Pass was named by Lt. John Parke who led the Pacific Railroad Survey 32nd parallel expedition to determine the route of the southernmost route of the transcontinental railroad through southern New Mexico Territory in 1855.  It is now the route taken by the Southern Pacific Railroad and Interstate 10.

References

Mountain passes of Arizona